Abraham Rabinovich is a historian and journalist who has published several books on recent Jewish history. As a reporter, his work has appeared in The Wall Street Journal, The New York Times, the International Herald Tribune, The New Republic, and The Christian Science Monitor. Before becoming a writer full-time, he was employed as a staff journalist for Newsday and The Jerusalem Post. He is a graduate of Brooklyn College and a veteran of the United States Army.  He is the cousin of the late Moshe Hirsch.

His published works include:
The Yom Kippur War: The Epic Encounter That Transformed the Middle East. Schocken Books, 2004. 
The Boats of Cherbourg. Naval Institute Press, 1997. 
Teddy Kollek: Builder of Jerusalem. Jewish Publication Society, 1996. 
Jerusalem on Earth: People, Passions, and Politics in the Holy City. Free Press, 1988. 
Jerusalem, the measure of the year. Carta, 1985. 
The Battle for Jerusalem, June 5–7, 1967. Jewish Publication Society, 1972.

References

External links 
Random House's author page
Amazon listing of books written

Living people
21st-century American historians
21st-century American male writers
Jewish American historians
Year of birth missing (living people)
Brooklyn College alumni
American male non-fiction writers
21st-century American Jews